Sholokhov Moscow State University for Humanities or Moscow State University for Humanities named after M.A. Sholokhov was founded in 1951 as Moscow Pedagogical Institute for Correspondence Studies. Sholokhov Moscow State University for Humanities bears an honorary name of Mikhail Sholokhov - a Russian writer who won the Nobel Prize for literature  in 1965. It has been merged with Moscow State Pedagogical University in 2015.

Ratings
In 2002 Sholokhov Moscow State University for Humanities was ranked by Russian Ministry of Education  among 10 best pedagogical universities in Russia. It also ranked Sholokhov Moscow State University for Humanities among 14 best  pedagogical and linguistic universities in Russia in 2005 (out of 78 rated).

Survey
An anonymous survey was recently conducted among current students and alumni. The university was evaluated on twelve criteria on a 5-point scale where higher score is better.
.
1)  Drug abuse among students/faculty – Excellent (5.00 points)
2)  Bribery among faculty and administrators – Excellent (5.00 points)
3)  Control over students' attendance – Good (4.21 points)
4)  Qualification of faculty – Good (4.17 points)
5)  Administrative control over level of students' knowledge – Good (4.12 points)
6)  Quality of teaching foreign languages – Good (4.02 points)
7)  Balanced combination of classes in curriculum – Some issues (3.99 points)
8)  Quality of education meets national standards – Some issues (3.97 points)
9)  Facilities – Some issues (3.56 points)
10) Job placement/career services – Problem (3.40 points)
11) Athletics and arts – Major problem (2.95 points)
12) Technology and learning aids – Major problem (2.94 points)

Faculty
355 members of the faculty hold Kandidat degree, 311 have appointments as Docents. 121 members of the faculty hold Doktor Nauk degree, 188 have appointments as Professors. Among the faculty, there are 9 fellows of Russian Academy of Education, 38 fellows of international academies. About 70% of the faculty hold Kandidat Nauk or Doktor Nauk degrees.

Students and alumni
The university has 9 branches in Russia, the total student body of Sholokhov Moscow State University for Humanities exceeds 36,000 people, about half of them in Moscow. The university's overall annual enrollment is about 8,000 students. The total number of living alumni exceeds 80,000 people.

Academic programs
Sholokhov Moscow State University for Humanities is a large public university that offers a variety of programs at undergraduate and graduate levels. This university is well known in Russia for its programs in Education (Pedagogy) and Special Education.

Undergraduate degrees
Undergraduate academic programs that lead to the Specialist degree after 5 years of study are offered by 17 departments of the university: Biology and Geography; Information Science and Mathematics; Psychology; Elementary Education; Pedagogy and Psychology; Pre-school Education; Special Education; European Languages; Foreign Languages; Philology; Journalism; Law; Technology and Entrepreneurship; Arts; Culture and Performing Arts; Design; History.

In 2002, the university first offered a joined program with the Open University of Israel that leads to a bachelor's degree in Jewish History and Culture.

Graduate degrees
Sholokhov Moscow State University for Humanities offers graduate degrees of Kandidat Nauk in 15 fields of study: Physics and Mathematics; Biology; History; Economics; Philosophy; Philology (Linguistics); Geography; Education; Art (Art History); Architecture; Psychology; Sociology; Political Science; Cultural Studies; Geoscience (Earth Science).

Sholokhov Moscow State University for Humanities offers graduate degrees of Doktor Nauk in 3 fields study: History; Philology (Linguistics); and Education.

Recent developments
The university recently engaged in various political education and activism projects, in support of the leading Russian political party – United Russia. For example, the university was a provider of educational services at the Seliger-2009 National Youth Forum. Head of the Sholokhov Moscow State University for Humanities, Vladimir Nechaev, met with the Prime Minister of Russia Vladimir Putin.

Head of the Sholokhov Moscow State University for Humanities, Vladimir Nechaev, recently signed a memorandum of understanding with the Provost of Oklahoma State University Robert (Bob) Sternberg.

Branches
University have a branches in following localities:
Anapa, Krasnodar Krai
Balabanovo, Kaluga Oblast
Derbent, Dagestan
Yegoryevsk, Moscow Oblast
Yekaterinburg, Sverdlovsk oblast
Zheleznovodsk, Stavropol Krai
Elista, Kalmykia
Likino-Dulevo, Moscow Oblast
Pokrov, Vladimir Oblast
Stavropol, Stavropol Krai
Sergiyev Posad, Moscow Oblast
Sterlitamak, Bashkortostan
Stupino, Moscow Oblast
Tomsk, Tomsk Oblast
Ufa, Bashkortostan
Cheboksary, Chuvash Republic
Shadrinsk, Kurgan Oblast
Yakutsk, Yakutia

See also
A Wikipedia profile of Prof. Verbitsky (Department of Psychology), Correspondent Fellow of Russian Academy of Education.

References

External links
Sholokhov Moscow State University for Humanities official website.
The Open University of Israel official website.
Russian Academy of Education official website (available only in Russian).

Educational institutions established in 1951
Universities in Moscow
Education in the Soviet Union
1951 establishments in Russia